KHAZ is a radio station airing a country music format licensed to Hays, Kansas, broadcasting on 99.5 MHz FM.  The station is owned by Eagle Communications, Inc.

References

External links

Country radio stations in the United States
HAZ